This is a list of Pakistani individuals and organizations who achieved international awards in recognition of their projects or social services for peace, human rights, education, health, public welfare and youth development etc.

World's highest ranking peace prizes

United Nations prize and special recognition

International merit awards (government based)

International merit awards (private)

International memorial awards

International women's awards

International children's awards

See also
 List of Pakistani Nobel laureates
 List of Pakistani journalists
 List of Pakistani writers
 List of Pakistanis
 List of Pakistani lawyers
 List of Pakistani poets
 List of Pakistani scientists
 List of Pakistani actresses
 List of Pakistani actors
 List of Pakistani models
 List of Pakistani Americans
 List of Pakistanis by net worth

References 

Pakistani
 
 
Pakistani Peace Laureates
Pacifists
Activists
Peace Laureates